1816 election may refer to:
1816 French legislative election
1816 United States presidential election
United States House of Representatives elections, 1816 and 1817